The 1913 Ole Miss Rebels football team represented the University of Mississippi during the 1913 college football season. The team was under suspension from the Southern Intercollegiate Athletic Association.

Schedule

References

Ole Miss
Ole Miss Rebels football seasons
Ole Miss Rebels football